Vanessa buana, the Lompobatang lady, is a butterfly of the family Nymphalidae found on Sulawesi in Indonesia.

References

Butterflies described in 1898
buana
Butterflies of Indonesia
Taxa named by Hans Fruhstorfer